"Seeing Things" is the second episode of the first season of the American anthology crime drama television series True Detective. The episode was written by series creator Nic Pizzolatto, and directed by executive producer Cary Joji Fukunaga. It was first broadcast on HBO in the United States on January 19, 2014.

The season focuses on Louisiana State Police homicide detectives Rustin "Rust" Cohle (Matthew McConaughey) and Martin "Marty" Hart (Woody Harrelson), who investigate the murder of prostitute Dora Lange in 1995. Seventeen years later, they must revisit the investigation, along with several other unsolved crimes. In the episode, Cohle and Hart continue their investigation, which now extends to her stay at a church. During this, Hart's family problems arise just as Cohle begins to deduce that Hart is cheating on his wife.

According to Nielsen Media Research, the episode was seen by an estimated 1.67 million household viewers and gained a 0.7 ratings share among adults aged 18–49. The episode received critical acclaim, with critics praising the performances, directing, pace and cinematography.

Plot

2012
Cohle (Matthew McConaughey) tells Gilbough (Michael Potts) and Papania (Tory Kittles) that he almost married a woman he met through Maggie (Michelle Monaghan), but his personality ended their relationship and he now works in a bar. He also goes into detail about his daughter's death, which led to his divorce. His police department transferred him to the Narcotics division, where he killed a man who was injecting a baby with drugs. He was then ordered to work undercover in the High Intensity Drug Trafficking Area program, where he worked for four years and was put in a psychiatric hospital after participating in a gunfight. Despite his experience, Cohle offered himself to transfer to the Homicides division in the Louisiana State Police. Due to his undercover days, he has experienced severe hallucinations.

In a separate interrogation, Hart (Woody Harrelson) notes how Cohle, despite his behavior, proved to be very efficient at his job. The interview reveals that Hart is now divorced from Maggie.

1995
Cohle and Hart question Dora Lange's mother, Mrs. Kelly (Tess Harper). She laments the situation and reveals that Dora's father died in a car accident 11 years before. She also reveals that Dora frequently attended a church before her disappearance. They then talk to one of Dora's friends, Carla (Amy Brassette), who corroborates Dora's relation to the church, also noting that she seemed different the last time she saw her.

While driving, Hart asks Cohle about the dinner and his decision to stay despite being intoxicated. Cohle reveals his marriage failure and his daughter's death, stating that he felt comfortable staying with Hart's family. Later that night, an intoxicated Hart visits his mistress, Lisa Tragnetti (Alexandra Daddario), at her home and they have sex. Somewhere, while buying methaqualone from a prostitute, Cohle is told that Dora worked at a brothel named The Ranch in the outskirts.

Before heading to the Ranch, Cohle deduces that Hart may be cheating on his wife, as his smell indicates sex and notes that he kept the same clothes as yesterday, indicating that he didn't return home. This moment angers Hart.

They leave the station and ask some mechanics about the location of The Ranch, who dismiss them. Cohle gets Hart back in their car, then returns to the mechanics, beating them for the address, which he gets. At the Ranch, they question Beth (Lili Simmons), a young prostitute who was friends with Dora and gives them a bag that belonged to Dora. In the bag, they find Dora's diary, which mentions things like "The Yellow King in Carcosa". Hart also confronts the brothel's madam, Jan (Andrea Frankle), for employing Beth even though she is a minor. Jan berates him back, telling him he knows nothing about the lives of the girls who work at the Ranch.

Hart and his family visit Maggie's parents. Hart spends time talking to her father and feeling lost with his personality and ideology, Hart asks his family to leave early, claiming he wants to investigate the case. That night, Hart and Maggie fight over the events. Hart is also uneasy when he finds that his daughters play with their dolls, where their positions resemble a ritual.

At their office, Major Quesada (Kevin Dunn) introduces a new task force to help the case, as the homicide delves into occultism, on petition of the Governor's evangelist cousin. Cohle is dismissive of the new task force and is rude to the detectives, prompting Quesada to angrily confront Cohle's behavior and their progress in the case. Quesada tells Cohle that Cohle's poor behavior is only tolerated in the force because of Hart's upstanding reputation. He forces them to cooperate with the task force or they will be removed from the case, also warning them to get a new lead in the case within a week.

Cohle and Hart visit the church, Friends of Christ Revival, which has been destroyed in a fire. As they inspect the dilapidated church, they find a drawing of a woman bound with antlers, which was in a similar position to Lange.

Production

Development
In January 2014, the episode's title was revealed as "Seeing Things" and it was announced that series creator Nic Pizzolatto had written the episode while executive producer Cary Joji Fukunaga had directed it. This was Pizzolatto's second writing credit, and Fukunaga's second directing credit.

Reception

Viewers
The episode was watched by 1.67 million viewers, earning a 0.7 in the 18-49 rating demographics on the Nielson ratings scale. This means that 0.7 percent of all households with televisions watched the episode. This was a 29% decrease from the previous episode, which was watched by 2.33 million viewers with a 1.0 in the 18-49 demographics.

Critical reviews
"Seeing Things" received critical acclaim. Jim Vejvoda of IGN gave the episode an "amazing" 9 out of 10 and wrote in his verdict, "As we begin to learn more about what makes Marty and Rust tick as people, we also dive deeper into an existential morass. True Detective may not be the feel good show of 2014, but it sure is great at making you want to fall down this particularly bleak rabbit hole."

Erik Adams of The A.V. Club gave the episode a "B+" grade and wrote, "Television history is full of characters who hold the same job as Marty and Rust; the medium's more recent history is full of men who behave like Marty. But what's making True Detective exceptional programming is in the way the program doesn't indulge their masks or their disguises, instead getting right to the point of depicting the animals within." Britt Hayes of Screen Crush wrote, "It becomes quite clear in 'Seeing Things' that Woody Harrelson and Matthew McConaughey are indeed very much playing to type, but they're so damn good at it."

Alan Sepinwall of HitFix wrote, "So even though some progress is made in the case, with the ruined church having a familiar-looking antler painting on one of the surviving walls, what we have mostly investigated here are these two men, one of whom claims to have all the answers but really understands almost nothing about himself and his surroundings, the other of whom understands far too well, and has therefore given up. Flip a coin as to which one of them you'd want to be. Neither option seems appealing right now, even as True Detective itself only becomes more engrossing in this second installment." Gwilym Mumford of The Guardian wrote, "This episode is preoccupied is masculinity, and the ways in which men seek to control the world around them – but there is still no sign of a suspect."

Kenny Herzog of Vulture gave the episode a perfect 5 star rating out of 5 and wrote, "Although outside of Cohle's Big Hug Mug at the '12 case interview and his way of half-heartedly demeaning possible sources into Dora's death, along with alluded-to stock office dustups, True Detective has already shed nearly any trace of being blackly comic. In fact, apart from the napalm-sky visions Cohle encounters en route to leads on the Dora Lange case, 'Seeing Things' is as charred as that torched First Revival Church. But as we head toward chapter three of eight, there's more to like in its darkening pull." Tony Sokol of Den of Geek gave the episode a perfect 5 star rating out of 5 and wrote, "At the end, Marty learns that the new detectives, the ones handling it now, in 2014, not the task force investigating animal mutilations, are onto something new. Once again, there is no fluff or bullshit on HBO's True Detective. Even Rust Cohle's flashbacks are handled realistically. He can tell what's real and what's not. Whether it's from the drug residue, political circle jerks or satanic scrawlings on abandoned chuches, it sometimes feels like he's mainlining the secret truths of the universe." 

Chris O'Hara of TV Fanatic gave the episode a perfect 5 star rating out of 5 and wrote, "With the second installment in the book, I can confidently say that I think we have a winner on our hands. The show reminds me more of The Killing than anything else, and that is a good thing in my mind. It's not the first crime drama and won't be the last, but the combination of Harrelson and McConaughey I think, will set True Detective apart from the rest." Shane Ryan of Paste gave the episode a 9.8 out of 10 and wrote, "It's difficult to know where to begin here, because I'm on fire with this show in a way that hasn't happened since — when? The Wire? But The Wire is organized and clinical and entirely different, lighting unrelated, landlocked pleasure zones of the superego, so the comparison doesn't make sense. Different passions, different planet altogether. This, this True Detective, is an offering of a separate magnitude, something bright and intelligent yet ultimately murky, ultimately of the id."

References

External links
 "Seeing Things" at HBO
 

2014 American television episodes
True Detective episodes
Television episodes written by Nic Pizzolatto